Silje Margaretha Solberg-Østhassel (born 16 June 1990) is a Norwegian handball player for Győri ETO KC and the Norwegian national team.

She is a twin sister of Sanna Solberg-Isaksen and is half Swedish through her mother.

Achievements
Olympic Games:
Bronze: 2020
World Championship:
Winner: 2015, 2021
Silver Medalist: 2017
European Championship:
Winner: 2014, 2016, 2020, 2022
Silver Medalist: 2012
Junior World Championship:
Winner: 2010
Junior European Championship:
Winner: 2009
EHF Champions League: 
Silver Medalist: 2022
Bronze Medalist: 2021
EHF Cup
Winner: 2015, 2019Hungarian ChampionshipWinner: 2022
Norwegian Cup:Finalist'': 2011, 2012

Individual awards 
All-Star Goalkeeper of Danish League 2015/2016
All-Star Goalkeeper of the European Championship: 2014
All-Star Goalkeeper of Postenligaen 2013/2014
MVP of the Møbelringen Cup: 2018

References

External links

 Silje Margaretha Solberg-Østhassel at the Norwegian Handball Federation 
 
 
 
 

1990 births
Living people
Sportspeople from Bærum
Norwegian people of Swedish descent
Twin sportspeople
Norwegian twins
Identical twins
Norwegian female handball players
Norwegian expatriate sportspeople in Denmark
Norwegian expatriate sportspeople in France
Norwegian expatriate sportspeople in Hungary
Expatriate handball players
TTH Holstebro players
Siófok KC players
Győri Audi ETO KC players
Handball players at the 2020 Summer Olympics
Olympic bronze medalists for Norway
Medalists at the 2020 Summer Olympics
Olympic medalists in handball
Olympic handball players of Norway